Geoffrey Keen (21 August 1916 – 3 November 2005) was an English actor who appeared in supporting roles in many films. He is well known for playing British Defence Minister Sir Frederick Gray in the James Bond films.

Biography

Early life
Keen was born in Wallingford, Berkshire, England, the son of stage actor Malcolm Keen. He was educated at Bristol Grammar School. He then joined the Little Repertory Theatre in Bristol for whom he made his stage debut in 1932. After a year in repertory he stayed for a year in Cannes before being accepted for a place at the London School of Economics. In a last-minute change of mind, he entered the Royal Academy of Dramatic Art, where he won the Bancroft Gold Medal after only one year. He had just joined the Royal Shakespeare Company in 1939 when the war started. Keen enlisted in the Royal Army Medical Corps, though also managed to appear in an Army instructional film for Carol Reed.

Career
Keen made his full film debut in 1946 in Riders of the New Forest but soon appeared in better known films for Reed such as Odd Man Out (1947), The Fallen Idol (1948) and The Third Man (1949). He quickly became one of the busiest character actors, typically doing five films a year. He also continued to perform on stage, for instance as Iachimo in Peter Hall's 1957 production of Cymbeline, and a sadistic Turkish General in Terence Rattigan's controversial play Ross (1960).

Keen was cast mainly as establishment figures, including government ministers, senior police officers and military figures, though he also appeared in working class roles in Chance of a Lifetime (1950) and Millions Like Us (1943). He often portrayed balding, cold-hearted, and sarcastic executives or lawyers. On television, he was one of the leads in BBC TV's long-running drama about the oil industry, The Troubleshooters, between 1965 and 1972.

On the big screen, he played the role of Minister of Defence Sir Frederick Gray in six James Bond films between 1977 and 1987:
 The Spy Who Loved Me
 Moonraker
 For Your Eyes Only
 Octopussy
 A View to a Kill
 The Living Daylights

He also appeared in The Spanish Gardener, Doctor Zhivago, Born Free and Cromwell, as well as in numerous TV programmes. He even appeared in a leading role in the Hammer horror film Taste the Blood of Dracula that starred Christopher Lee. In all, Keen had appeared in 100 films before he retired in 1991.

Filmography

Film

 The New Lot (1943) as Corporal (uncredited)
 Odd Man Out (1947) as Soldier (uncredited)
 Riders of the New Forest (1948) as Mr. Rivers 
 The Fallen Idol (1948) as Detective Davis
 It's Hard to Be Good (1948) as Sergeant Todd
 The Small Back Room (1949) as Pinker
 The Third Man (1949) as British Military Policeman (uncredited) 
 Chance of a Lifetime (1950) as Bolger
 Treasure Island (1950) as Israel Hands
 Seven Days to Noon (1950) as Alf
 The Clouded Yellow (1950) as Police Inspector 
 Cheer the Brave (1951) as Wilson
 Green Grow the Rushes (1951) as Spencer Prudhoe
 High Treason (1951) as Morgan Williams
 Cry, the Beloved Country (1951) as Father Vincent 
 His Excellency (1952) as Morellos
 Hunted (1952) as Detective Inspector Deakin
 Angels One Five (1952) as Station Personnel: Company Sergeant Major
 Lady in the Fog (1952) as Christopher Hampden
 The Long Memory (1953) as Craig
 Genevieve (1953) as Policeman
 Turn the Key Softly (1953) as Mr. Gregory
 Malta Story (1953) as British Soldier (uncredited)
 Rob Roy: The Highland Rogue (1953) as Killeran
 Meet Mr. Lucifer (1953) as Mr. Lucifer (voice)
 Face the Music (1954) as Maurie Green
 The Maggie (1954) as Campbell
 Doctor in the House (1954) as Dean
 The Divided Heart (1954) as Marks
 Carrington V.C. (1954) as President
 The Awakening (1954) as The Supervisor
 The Glass Cage (1955) as Harry Stanton
 Passage Home (1955) as Ike the bosun
 Doctor at Sea (1955) as Hornbean
 Storm Over the Nile (1955) as Dr. Sutton
 Portrait of Alison (1955) as Inspector Colby
 A Town Like Alice (1956) as Noel Strachan
 The Man Who Never Was (1956) as Gen. Archibald Nye
 The Long Arm (1956) as Chief Superintendent Malcolm
 Yield to the Night (1956) as Prison Chaplain
 Loser Takes All (1956) as Reception Clerk
 Sailor Beware! (1956) as Rev. Mr. Purefoy
 House of Secrets (1956) as Col. Burleigh, CIA
 Zarak (1956) as Carruthers (uncredited)
 The Spanish Gardener (1956) as Dr. Harvey
 Town on Trial (1957) as Charles Dixon
 The Secret Place (1957) as Mr. Haywood
 Fortune Is a Woman (1957) as Michael Abercrombie aka Young Abercrombie
 Doctor at Large (1957) as Second Examiner
 The Scamp (1957) as Headmaster
 The Birthday Present (1957) as Col. Wilson
 Nowhere to Go (1958) as Inspector Scott
 Web of Evidence (1959) as Prison Governor
 Horrors of the Black Museum (1959) as Supt. Graham
 Deadly Record (1959) as Supt. Ambrose
 The Boy and the Bridge (1959) as Bridge Master
 The Scapegoat (1959) as Gaston
 Devil's Bait (1959) as Joe Frisby
 The Dover Road Mystery (1960) as Superintendent Graham
 The Malpas Mystery (1960) as Torrington
 Sink the Bismarck! (1960) as Assistant Chief of the Naval Staff 
 The Angry Silence (1960) as Davis
 The Silent Weapon (1961) Scotland Yard (film series) as Superintendent Carter
 No Love for Johnnie (1961) as The Prime Minister – Reginald Stevens
 Spare the Rod (1961) as Arthur Gregory
 Raising the Wind (1961) as Sir John
 A Matter of WHO (1961) as Foster
 The Inspector (1962) as Commissioner Bartels
 The Spiral Road (1962) as Willem Wattereus
 Live Now, Pay Later (1962) as Reggie Corby
 Return to Sender (1962) as Robert Lindley
 The Mind Benders (1963) as Calder
 Torpedo Bay (1963) as Hodges
 The Cracksman (1963) as Magistrate
 Dr. Syn, Alias the Scarecrow (1963) as General Pugh
 The Heroes of Telemark (1965) as General Bolt
 Doctor Zhivago (1965) as Prof. Boris Kurt
 Born Free (1966) as Kendall
 Berserk! (1967) as Commissioner Dalby
 Thunderbird 6 (1968) as James Glenn (voice)
 Taste the Blood of Dracula (1970) as William Hargood
 Cromwell (1970) as John Pym
 Sacco e Vanzetti (1971) as Judge Webster Thayer 
 Doomwatch (1972) as Sir Henry Leyton
 Living Free (1972) as Kendall
 QB VII (1974) as Magistrate Griffin
 The Spy Who Loved Me (1977) as Sir Frederick Gray
 No. 1 of the Secret Service (1977) as Rockwell
 Holocaust 2000 (1977) as Gynecologist
 Moonraker (1979) as Sir Frederick Gray
 Licensed to Love and Kill (1979) as Stockwell
 For Your Eyes Only (1981) as Sir Frederick Gray
 Rise and Fall of Idi Amin (1981) as British Ambassador
 Octopussy (1983) as Sir Frederick Gray
 A View to a Kill (1985) as Sir Frederick Gray
 The Living Daylights (1987) as Sir Frederick Gray (final film role)

Television
 The Adventures of Robin Hood – episode – The Wager (1956) – Blind Beggar
 Death in Ecstasy in 1964 as Inspector Roderick Alleyn, based on the Ngaio Marsh novel
 The Saint – episode – The Saint Steps In (1964) – Hobart Quennel
 The Troubleshooters - main cast - 1965-72 - Brian Stead
 Return of the Saint – episode – The Debt Collectors (1978) – Sir Charles

References

External links

1916 births
2005 deaths
20th-century English male actors
Alumni of RADA
English male film actors
Golders Green Crematorium
Male actors from Oxfordshire
People educated at Bristol Grammar School
People from Wallingford, Oxfordshire
Royal Shakespeare Company members
British Army personnel of World War II
Royal Army Medical Corps soldiers